Italian concentration camps include camps from the Italian colonial wars in Africa as well as camps for the civilian population from areas occupied by Italy during World War II. Memory of both camps were subjected to "historical amnesia". The repression of memory led to historical revisionism in Italy and in 2003 the Italian media published Silvio Berlusconi's statement that Benito Mussolini only "used to send people on vacation".

Colonial wars

There were numerous war crimes conducted by the Italian Army in the colonies. In Cyrenaica alone between 1929 and 1933 over 40,000 people were killed and 80,000 locked up in concentration camps, out of a total population of just 193,000. According to the historian Ilan Pappé, the fascist regime between 1928 and 1932 killed half the Bedouin population either directly or by starvation in the fields. According to the historian Angelo Del Boca, in 1933, of the approximately 100,000 Libyans deported from Jebel Achdar and Marmarica, more than 40,000 died in the camps.

World War II

References

External links
 campifascisti.it, Online Research project
 "The Last Witnesses", 2013 Exhibition at National Museum for Contemporary History (Slovenia) documenting photos and interviews with survivors

Concentration camps
 
Italy in World War II